Nathaniel Richards may refer to:

 Nathaniel Richards (Marvel Comics), a Marvel Comics character
 Nathaniel Richards (settler) (1604–1681), founding settler of Hartford and Norwalk, Connecticut
 Nathanael Richards (fl. 1630–1654), English dramatist and poet